Zárate is a surname of Spanish (Basque) origin.

People with this name
 Agustín de Zárate (1514–1575), Spanish colonial civil servant, chronicler and historian
 Alexis Zárate (born 1994), Argentine football player
 Antonia Zárate (1775–1811), Spanish actress
 Ariel Zárate (born 1973), Argentine football player and manager, brother of Sergio, Rolando and Mauro Zárate
 Camila Zárate Mahecha (born 1987), Colombian actress
 Camila Zárate Zárate (born 1992), Chilean political activist
 Carlos Isagani Zarate (born 1967), Filipino politician
 Carlos Zárate Serna (born 1951), Mexican boxer
 Carlos Zárate Jr. (born 1988), Mexican boxer, son of Carlos Zárate Serna
 Carlos Zárate Fernández (born 1980), Spanish cyclist
 Darío Zárate (born 1977), Argentine football player
 Eladio Zárate (born 1942), Paraguayan football player
 Fernando Zárate Salgado (born 1979), Mexican politician
 Francisco de Zárate y Terán (1610–1679), Spanish Roman Catholic prelate
 Gonzalo Zárate (born 1984), Argentine football player
 Jesús Zárate (born 1974), Mexican cyclist
 Jonathan Zárate (born 1999), Argentine football player
 Jorge Zárate (born 1992), Mexican football player
 Jorge Zárate (actor), Mexican actor
 José Zárate (1949–2013), Colombian football player
 José Inez García Zárate (also known by Juan Francisco López-Sánchez and other names), carried out the shooting of Kathryn Steinle
 Juan Zarate, American attorney and security advisor
 Juan Zárate, Argentine football player
 Junior Zarate (born 1978), Mexican football player
 Leandro Zárate (born 1984), Argentine football player
 León Zárate, Argentine actor
 Lucía Zárate (1864–1890), Mexican entertainer with dwarfism who performed in sideshows
 Luis Zárate (1940–2020), Mexican cyclist
 Manuel Alejandro Zárate (born 1988), Mexican football player
 Mauro Zárate (born 1987), Argentine football player, brother of Sergio, Ariel and Rolando Zárate
 Mauro Zárate (baseball) (born 1983), Venezuelan baseball player
 Maximiliano Zárate (born 1993), Argentine football player
 Nahuel Zárate (born 1993), Argentine football player
 Nirma Zárate (1936–1999), Colombian artist
 Oscar Zárate (born 1942), Argentine comic book artist and illustrator
 Pablo Zárate, known as Willka, Bolivian rebel leader
 Radamel Falcao, Colombian football player whose maternal surname is Zárate
 Rafael de Zárate y Sequera (ca. 1824–ca. 1904), mayor of Ponce, Puerto Rico, 1884-1886
 Robert Zarate (born 1987), Venezuelan baseball player
 Roberto Zárate (1932–2013), Argentine football player
 Rolando Zárate (born 1978), Argentine football player, brother of Sergio, Ariel and Mauro Zárate
 Rosa Zárate y Ontaneda (1763 -1813), Ecuadorian feminist activist
 Sergio Zárate (born 1969), Argentine football player, brother of Ariel, Rolando and Mauro Zárate
 Susan Zarate, American costume illustrator 
 Tobías Zárate (born 2000), Argentine-born Chilean football player, son of Rolando Zárate 

Basque-language surnames
Surnames of Spanish origin

de:Zárate (Begriffsklärung)
es:Zárate (desambiguación)
fr:Zarate
it:Zárate
nl:Zárate
pt:Zárate (desambiguação)
ru:Сарате